Yarygino is a rural locality (a village) in Tarnogskoye Rural Settlement, Tarnogsky District, Vologda Oblast, Russia. The population was 9 as of 2002.

Geography 
Yarygino is located 16 km southwest of Tarnogsky Gorodok (the district's administrative centre) by road. Chist is the nearest rural locality.

References 

Rural localities in Tarnogsky District